Acústico MTV is the sixth album by Brazilian band O Rappa and their second live album. It was produced by Carlos Eduardo Miranda. It is distributed through Warner Music.
It was recorded in May 2005 in São Paulo. The crowd was made up of only friends of the band and members of the official fan club.

Track listing
"Na Frente Do Reto" – 5:29
"Mar De Gente" – 4:54
"Brinxton, Bronx Ou Baixada" – 5:53
"Homem Amarelo" – 6:33
"Lado B Lado A" – 5:15
"Reza Vela" – 6:29
"Se Não Avisar O Bicho Pega" – 4:39
"Rodo Cotidiano" – 6:17
"Não Perca As Crianças De Vista" – 5:22
"Pescador De Ilusões" – 5:06
"O Salto" – 5:42
"Papo De Surdo E Mudo" – 5:00
"Eu Quero Ver Gol" – 6:34

Track 3: O Rappa
Tracks 10 and 13: Rappa Mundi
Tracks 4, 5 and 7: Lado B Lado A
Tracks 2, 6, 8, 11 and 12: O Silêncio Q Precede O Esporro

Personnel
 O Rappa
 Marcelo Falcão - voz, violâo Gravina e craviola
 Xandão - violão, craviola, viola caipira, bandolim, cavaco e acordólia
 Lauro Farias - baixolão e baby bass
 Marcelo Lobato - bateria, órgão, steel drums, campainhas, marimba Orff, tubular bells e vibrafone

 Músicos Adicionais
 Marcos Lobato - piano de armário, piano elétrico, órgão, harmônio e vibrafone
 Dj Negralha - gramodisco, gramofone e percussão
 Pedro Leão - violão, craviola e bandolim
 Bernardo Aguiar & Juninho - percussão
 Alessandra Rodrigues, Play & Vinícius Falcão - vocais

 Participações Especiais
 Siba - rabeca em "Homem Amarelo", "Mitologia Gerimum" e "Cristo & Oxalá"
 Maria Rita - vocais em "O Que Sobrou do Céu" e "Rodo Cotidiano"

See also
Official Site

References

Acustico Mtv (O Rappa album)
O Rappa albums
2005 live albums